The Suit may refer to:
 Demi's Birthday Suit or The Suit, a trompe-l'œil body painting by Joanne Gair
 "The Suit" (short story), a 1963 short story by Can Themba
 The Suit (2003 film), a film by Bakhtyar Khudojnazarov 
 The Suit (2016 film), a short drama film from South Africa

See also 
 Suit (disambiguation)